Sun Haosheng (born 1 February 1988) is a Chinese former footballer who played as a full-back.

Club career
Sun Haosheng started his professional football career in 2010 when he joined Dalian Aerbin for the 2010 China League Two campaign. He would be part of the squad that won the division title and promotion into the second tier. The following season he would go on to aid his team with another division title and promotion into the top tier.
Within the Chinese Super League Sun struggled to gain any playing time throughout the 2012 Chinese Super League season and in February 2013, Sun moved to China League One side Guizhou Zhicheng on a one-year loan deal.

On 15 January 2015, Sun transferred to China League One side Shijiazhuang Yongchang where in his debut season with the club he was able to gain promotion with his new team. On 13 September 2015, Sun made his debut for Shijiazhuang in the 2015 Chinese Super League against Henan Jianye, coming on as a substitute for Hu Wei in the 62nd minute.

On 1 February 2019, Sun transferred to fellow League One side Zhejiang Greentown. He would have to wait until 19 September 2020 to make his debut in a league game against Shaanxi Chang'an Athletic F.C. that ended in a 1-1 draw. The following season he would be loaned out to third tier club Hebei Zhuoao. On his return, Sun retired from professional football after the 2021 season.

Career statistics 
Statistics accurate as of match played 14 April 2022.

Honours

Club
Dalian Aerbin
China League One: 2011
China League Two: 2010

References

External links
 

1988 births
Living people
Chinese footballers
Footballers from Shandong
Dalian Professional F.C. players
Guizhou F.C. players
Cangzhou Mighty Lions F.C. players
Zhejiang Professional F.C. players
Chinese Super League players
China League One players
China League Two players
Association football midfielders